Peter Sandborn from the University of Maryland, College Park, MD was named Fellow of the Institute of Electrical and Electronics Engineers (IEEE) in 2014 for contributions to the analysis of cost and life-cycle of electronic systems.

References

Fellow Members of the IEEE
Living people
Year of birth missing (living people)
Place of birth missing (living people)
University of Maryland, College Park faculty
American electrical engineers